Milad Karimi (born 21 June 1999) is a Kazakh artistic gymnast. He represented Kazakhstan at the 2020 Summer Olympics in Tokyo, Japan.

Competitive history

Career 

In 2017, he won the bronze medal in the horizontal bar event at the Asian Artistic Gymnastics Championships held in Bangkok, Thailand. A few months later, he represented Kazakhstan at the 2017 Summer Universiade in Taipei, Taiwan without winning a medal. In the same year, he also competed in the floor exercise at the 2017 World Artistic Gymnastics Championships held in Montreal, Quebec, Canada.

He represented Kazakhstan at the 2018 Asian Games held in Jakarta, Indonesia. In the horizontal bar he finished in 8th place in the final and in the floor exercise he finished in 5th place in the final. He also competed in the men's artistic team event where Kazakhstan finished in 6th place in the final.

In 2019, he won the silver medal in the horizontal bar event at the Summer Universiade held in Naples, Italy. In 2020, he won the bronze medal in the floor exercise in Melbourne, Australia as part of the 2020 FIG Artistic Gymnastics World Cup series. He also won the silver medal in the horizontal bar event. In the competition held in Baku, Azerbaijan he also won the bronze medal in the floor exercise.

He represented his country at the 2020 Summer Olympics. He qualified for the All-around finals as well as event finals for floor exercise and horizontal bar. He finished 14th in the all-around finals, 5th in floor and 8th in the horizontal bar.

References

External links 
 

Living people
1999 births
Sportspeople from Almaty
Kazakhstani male artistic gymnasts
Universiade medalists in gymnastics
Universiade silver medalists for Kazakhstan
Competitors at the 2017 Summer Universiade
Gymnasts at the 2018 Asian Games
Asian Games competitors for Kazakhstan
Medalists at the 2019 Summer Universiade
Gymnasts at the 2020 Summer Olympics
Olympic gymnasts of Kazakhstan
21st-century Kazakhstani people